Anas Sharbini (born 21 February 1987) is a retired Croatian professional footballer. He played as an attacking midfielder or winger, and was best known for his dribbling and crossing skills.

Club career

Rijeka
Born in Rijeka, Sharbini rose through the ranks of his home-town club HNK Rijeka, starting his professional career with the club in 2005. Despite his young age, he was chosen to captain the side in the 2007–08 season. At Rijeka, he gained a reputation as one of the league's best dribblers and was famous for often scoring late equalizers. He was also selected by IMScouting as a "Player to Watch". Sharbini was Rijeka's top scorer with 14 goals in 2008–09 and second top scorer with 11 goals in 2007–08. Overall, prior to his transfer, he scored 28 goals in 72 league appearances for Rijeka.

Hajduk Split
On 13 August 2009 he signed for Hajduk Split in a deal which included bringing his brother Ahmad Sharbini to the Dalmatian club. The talented youngster had some troubles adjusting to his new environment and due to the club's struggles in finding and then keeping a coach for a longer term, he often found himself on and off the starting XI. He struggled to score as freely as he did at Rijeka but in between his consistent runs, he also put in some top notch performances carrying his struggling club on their way to consecutive second-place finishes in the Prva HNL in 2009–10 and 2010–11.

Sharbini reignited himself as a player in the 2011–12 season under coach Krasimir Balakov, who employed him as a left winger. After receiving heavy criticism for underperforming for some time, he scored a brace against NK Istra 1961 in a 3–0 win for Hajduk.

Ittihad
In July 2012, Sharbini was transferred to Ittihad for a sum of €1.8 million and signed a two-year contract.

Return to Rijeka
On 23 May 2013, Sharbini returned to Rijeka. He signed a two-year contract with an option for an additional year. On 29 July 2015, Sharbini signed a new three-year contract with Rijeka, extending his stay at the club until June 2018. In November 2015, after finding out he would be on the substitute's bench, Rijeka's captain Sharbini refused to travel with his teammates to Rijeka's league match against NK Osijek. He was fined €10,000 for the incident and stripped of the club's captaincy.

On 2 February 2016, Sharbini was loaned to Osmanlıspor, who play in the Turkish Süper Lig, until June 2016. He did not make any appearances during his time with Osmanlıspor due to injury. After his loan to Osmanlıspor ended, Sharbini had two years of his Rijeka contract remaining. In an unusual situation, Sharbini was not wanted back at Rijeka by both the club and coach Kek, but refused to sign for another club. According to some sources Sharbini was Rijeka's second highest paid player in 2017, despite not having played a single game.

Grobničan
On 3 July 2018 Sharbini signed for fourth tier club Grobničan. Even though he played a friendly match against Opatija during pre-season he did not play in any official matches for the club even though he was signed as a played and did not have any injuries.

International career
Sharbini won 29 caps and scored 10 goals in various youth levels of Croatia and made his biggest impact with the Croatian U19 team. Due to his fine form in the 2007–08 season, national manager Slaven Bilić called him up to represent Croatia in their Euro 2008 campaign, as a reserve in case of injuries. As a highly rated youngster, he was also called up as a reserve for the Croatian national football team at Euro 2008, and most recently, for the 2010 FIFA World Cup qualifier against England in September 2009. Finally, he made his first appearance in the match against Qatar on 8 October 2009, which Croatia won 3–2. He scored his first international goal in his second cap five years later, opening a 1–2 defeat in a friendly match against Argentina in London on 12 November 2014.

Achievements
Brothers Anas and Ahmad Sharbini are the only siblings to have scored a hat-trick each in a single match in top-tier European football leagues. In the first round fixture of the 2009–10 Croatian First Football League season against NK Lokomotiva, the brothers took turns. Ahmad opened the scoring after four minutes, Anas doubled the lead in the 27th minute and Ahmad made it 3–0 in the 35th minute. In the second half Anas converted a penalty in 51st minute, Ahmad completed his hat-trick in the 68th minute and two minutes later Anas scored his third goal.

Anas Sharbini holds the Croatian First Football League record in the number of assists since 2007–08, the first season for which assist data was collected. In 184 appearances for Rijeka and Hajduk Split, Sharbini set-up 67 goals.

With 39 goals to his account, Sharbini is Rijeka's third top scorer in the Croatian First Football League.

Career statistics

Club

International

Scores and results list Croatia's goal tally first, score column indicates score after each Sharbini goal.

Personal life
Sharbini's older brother, Ahmad Sharbini, was also a professional footballer who played with Rijeka. Sharbini is of Albanian,  Palestinian and Croatian descent.  He was born in  Rijeka, to a local Albanian Croatian mother and Palestinian father, Jamal Al-Sharbini, from Damascus, Syria.

Honours

Rijeka
Croatian Football Cup (2): 2005–06, 2013–14
Croatian Football Super Cup (1): 2014

Hajduk Split
Croatian Football Cup (1): 2009–10

Individual
Sportske novosti Yellow Shirt award (1): 2011–12
Most assists in the Croatian First Football League: 2010–11

References

External links

Anas Sharbini  at HNK Rijeka 

1987 births
Living people
Footballers from Rijeka
Croatian people of Palestinian descent
Croatian people of Albanian descent
Croatian Muslims
Association football midfielders
Croatian footballers
Croatia youth international footballers
Croatia under-21 international footballers
Croatia international footballers
HNK Rijeka players
HNK Hajduk Split players
Ittihad FC players
Croatian Football League players
Saudi Professional League players
Croatian expatriate footballers
Expatriate footballers in Saudi Arabia
Croatian expatriate sportspeople in Saudi Arabia
Expatriate footballers in Turkey
Croatian expatriate sportspeople in Turkey